The Third Municipality (In Italian: Terza Municipalità or Municipalità 3) is one of the ten boroughs in which the Italian city of Naples is divided.

Geography
The municipality is located in central and northern area of the city, including a large bit of the historical center.

Its territory includes the zones of Colli Aminei, Rione Sanità and Capodimonte, famous for the museum, the park and the palace.

Administrative division
The Third Municipality is divided into 2 quarters:

References

External links
 Municipalità 3 page on Naples website

Municipality 03